"Karma" is the third single from Lloyd Banks's debut album, The Hunger for More. It features Avant on the music video and radio version, while singer Kevin Cossom provides additional vocals on the album version of the song.

Background
Karma was released in October 2004. It debuted at #71 and peaked at #17 on the U.S. Billboard Hot 100. It features R&B singer Avant on the video and radio versions, while singer Kevin Cossom appears on the chorus of the album version. The song was produced by Greg "Ginx" Doby and samples "Inseparable" by Natalie Cole.

Music video
The music video for the song was directed by Little X and features a guest appearance from KD Aubert as Lloyd Banks's love interest. At the end of the video the screen goes static and Tony Yayo raps his verse from the song Ain't No Click.

Charts

Weekly charts

Year-end charts

Release history

References

2004 singles
Lloyd Banks songs
2004 songs
Songs written by Lloyd Banks
G-Unit Records singles
Interscope Records singles
Songs written by Kevin Cossom